Jan "Lill-Damma" Mattsson (born 17 April 1951) is a Swedish former professional football player.

He was capped 13 times for Sweden.

References

External links 
 

1951 births
Living people
Swedish footballers
Sweden international footballers
Swedish expatriate footballers
Östers IF players
KFC Uerdingen 05 players
Fortuna Düsseldorf players
Allsvenskan players
Bundesliga players
2. Bundesliga players
Expatriate footballers in Germany
Swedish football managers
GIF Sundsvall managers
Mjällby AIF managers
Östers IF managers

Association football forwards